Oilmont is an abandoned community located in the state of Montana. The community was abandoned when chemicals used in oil extraction contaminated the local water table.

Oilmont was an unincorporated community in Toole County, Montana, United States. Interstate 15 passes near the community, with access from Exit 379.

It is the location of Bethany Lutheran Church, which is listed on the National Register of Historic Places. The Absure Refinery processed petroleum from the nearby Kevin Sunburst Oil Field.

References

Unincorporated communities in Toole County, Montana
Unincorporated communities in Montana